The 2005 Lincolnshire County Council election was held on Thursday, 5 May 2005, the same day as the general election. The whole council of 77 members was up for election and the election resulted in the Conservative Party retaining control of the council, winning 45 seats.

Election result

Results by division

Alford and Sutton

Ancholme Cliff

Bardney and Cherry Willingham

Bassingham Rural

Billinghay and Metheringham

Boston Coastal

Boston East

Boston Fishtoft

Boston North West

Boston Rural

Boston South

Boston West

Bourne Abbey

Bourne Castle

Bracebridge Heath and Waddington

Branston and Navenby

Colsterworth Rural

Crowland and Whaplode

Deeping St James

Donington Rural

Folkingham Rural

Gainsborough Hill

Gainsborough Rural South

Gainsborough Trent

Grantham Barrowby

References

2005 English local elections
2000s in Lincolnshire
2005